The slaty-winged foliage-gleaner (Philydor fuscipenne) is a perching bird species in the ovenbird family (Furnariidae).

It is found in Colombia, Ecuador, and Panama. Its natural habitats are subtropical or tropical moist lowland forests and subtropical or tropical moist montane forests.

References

slaty-winged foliage-gleaner
Birds of Colombia
Birds of Ecuador
Birds of Panama
slaty-winged foliage-gleaner
slaty-winged foliage-gleaner
Taxonomy articles created by Polbot